Tatomireşti may refer to several villages in Romania:

 Tatomireşti, a village in Brădeşti Commune, Dolj County
 Tatomireşti, a village in Rebricea Commune, Vaslui County